Kirton Lindsey railway station serves the town of Kirton in Lindsey in North Lincolnshire, Lincolnshire, England. The station was opened in 1849 on the former main line of the Great Grimsby and Sheffield Junction Railway which became part of the Manchester, Sheffield and Lincolnshire Railway.

The station was built with two flanking platforms with the main station building on the Sheffield-bound side at the top of a long approach road. The Grimsby-bound platform had a simple waiting shelter and the platforms were linked by a latticed footbridge. The footbridge and Grimsby bound platform have since been removed and the route reduced to a single track at this point.

Service
All services at Kirton Lindsey are operated by Northern Trains.

Weekday services have not called here since October 1993, when British Rail withdrew them at the end of the summer timetable.

References

External links

Timetable for train services on Northern Rail's website

Railway stations in the Borough of North Lincolnshire
DfT Category F2 stations
Former Great Central Railway stations
Railway stations in Great Britain opened in 1849
Northern franchise railway stations
Low usage railway stations in the United Kingdom
1849 establishments in England
Kirton in Lindsey